The 2011–12 Primera División season is the 121st season of top-flight professional football in Argentina. A total of 20 teams will compete in the league. It started on August 5, 2011 and ended on July 1, 2012.

Club information

Managerial changes

Torneo Apertura
The 2011 Apertura was the first championship of the season. It began on August 5 and ended on February 4, 2012.

Standings

Results

Top goalscorers

Torneo Clausura
The 2012 Clausura was the second and final championship of the season. It started on February 10 and ended on June 24, 2012.

Standings

Results

Top goalscorers

Source: Soccerway

Relegation
Source:

Relegation/promotion playoffs
The 17th and 18th placed teams in the relegation table (San Martín (San Juan) and San Lorenzo, respectively) played the 3rd and 4th-place finishers of the 2011–12 Primera B Nacional season (Instituto and Rosario Central, respectively); the winner of each claiming a spot in the following Primera División season. The Primera División team (Team 1) played the second leg at home with sporty advantage if the aggregate would have been drawn. Both San Lorenzo and San Martín (San Juan) remained in the Primera División.
These were the last promotions played between Argentine Primera División and Primera B Nacional teams.

|-
!colspan="5"|Relegation/promotion playoff 1

|-
!colspan="5"|Relegation/promotion playoff 2

|-
|}

International qualification
The 2011–12 Primera League table contributes towards qualifying for CONMEBOL tournaments in 2012 and 2013.

2012 CONMEBOL Tournaments
International qualification for the 2012 season presented a change from previous ones. Qualification for the first four Copa Libertadores berths comprises the previous season's Clausura champion, this season's Apertura champion, and the top two non-champions in an aggregate table of the aforementioned tournaments). The fifth Copa Libertadores berth was given to the best team in the Copa Sudamericana who has not already qualified otherwise.

Qualification to the Copa Sudamericana was determined through the same aggregate table as the Copa Libertadores. However, the six berths went to the top five teams that have not qualified for the Copa Libertadores and who were not participating in the relegation/promotion playoffs, and the Copa Argentina champion.

2013 Copa Libertadores
The winner of the Clausura 2012 tournament (Arsenal) qualified directly. Other teams will qualify based on their combined points in Clausura 2012 and Inicial 2012.

References

External links
2011–12 Argentine Primera División season at Soccerway
Official regulations

1
Argentine Primera División seasons